Barnett Brook is a hamlet in the Newhall and Dodcott cum Wilkesley civil parishes in the Cheshire East area of Cheshire, England. The hamlet is situated around a road bridge carrying Sheppenhall Lane across Barnett Brook, a tributary of the River Weaver. The sandstone bridge dates from the early to mid 19th century and is a grade II listed building.

References

Villages in Cheshire